Milan Máčala (born 4 August 1943) is a Czech football coach who coached various clubs in the Czech Republic and the Middle East.

He has previously coached in the area with the national teams of Oman, United Arab Emirates, Saudi Arabia, Kuwait and Bahrain, winning the Gulf Cup of Nations with the Kuwait in 1996 and 1998. As a player, he made his name with SK Sigma Olomouc where he also began his coaching career before going on to work for Slavia Prague, FC Baník Ostrava, the Czechoslovakia national football team, Kazma Sporting Club, Al Nasr and Al Ain FC.

Milan Máčala left his position as head coach of Bahrain in 2010 by mutual consent.

References

External links
 Interview and career details (in Czech)
 Profile

1943 births
People from Zlín District
Czech footballers
Czech football managers
Czech expatriate football managers
Czechoslovak footballers
Czechoslovak football managers
Living people
SK Sigma Olomouc players
FC Fastav Zlín players
MFK Vítkovice players
FC Viktoria Plzeň players
FC Baník Ostrava managers
SK Slavia Prague managers
Czechoslovakia national football team managers
Kuwait national football team managers
United Arab Emirates national football team managers
Saudi Arabia national football team managers
Oman national football team managers
Bahrain national football team managers
Al Ain FC managers
Nea Salamis Famagusta FC managers
Expatriate football managers in Qatar
Expatriate football managers in Saudi Arabia
1996 AFC Asian Cup managers
1997 FIFA Confederations Cup managers
1999 FIFA Confederations Cup managers
2000 AFC Asian Cup managers
2004 AFC Asian Cup managers
2007 AFC Asian Cup managers
Expatriate football managers in Bahrain
Expatriate football managers in the United Arab Emirates
Expatriate football managers in Kuwait
Expatriate football managers in Cyprus
Expatriate football managers in Oman
Czechoslovak expatriate sportspeople in Cyprus
Czech expatriate sportspeople in Kuwait
Czech expatriate sportspeople in the United Arab Emirates
Czech expatriate sportspeople in Saudi Arabia
Czech expatriate sportspeople in Oman
Czech expatriate sportspeople in Bahrain
Czech expatriate sportspeople in Qatar
Association football defenders
Kazma SC managers
Kuwait Premier League managers
Sportspeople from the Zlín Region